"West End Girls" is the name of a popular song by the Pet Shop Boys.

West End Girls may also refer to:
 West End Girls (book), a book by Barbara Tate
West End Girls (Canadian band)
West End Girls (Swedish band)
"West End Girls", a season four episode of Degrassi: The Next Generation
West End Girls drag troupe in West Seattle

See also
West End (disambiguation)